Spingarn is a surname. Notable people with the surname include:

Joel Elias Spingarn (1875-1939), American educator, literary critic and civic activist
Arthur B. Spingarn (1878-1971), brother of Joel Elias Spingarn
Stephen J. Spingarn (1908–1984), son of Joel, American politician during Truman administration

See also
Spingarn Medal, an annual award for outstanding achievement by an African American